The Lakeland School District is a small, rural, public school district located in northern Lackawanna County, Pennsylvania. It comprises the boroughs of Jermyn and Mayfield and the townships of Carbondale (to be distinguished from the city of Carbondale which it partially surrounds), Greenfield, and Scott. It was organized June 30, 1968 as a jointure among the three districts previously serving the five municipalities. Lakeland School District attendance area had a population of 11,966, according to the 2000 federal census. By 2010, the district's population increased to 12,097 people. The educational attainment levels for the School District population (25 years old and over) were 91.8% high school graduates and 24.7% college graduates. The district is one of the 500 public school districts of Pennsylvania.

According to the Pennsylvania Budget and Policy Center, 29.2% of the district's pupils lived at 185% or below the Federal Poverty Level   as shown by their eligibility for the federal free or reduced price school meal programs in 2012. In 2009, Lakeland School District residents' per capita income was $18,876, while the median family income was $45,653 a year. In the Commonwealth, the median family income was $49,501 and the United States median family income was $49,445, in 2010.  In Lackawanna County, the median household income was $43,673. By 2013, the median household income in the United States rose to $52,100. In 2014, the median household income in the USA was $53,700.

Lakeland School District operates three schools: Lakeland Elementary School - Scott Campus (K-6), Lakeland Elementary School - Mayfield Campus (K-6), and Lakeland Junior/Senior High School (7-12). Occupational training and adult education in various vocational and technical fields were provided by the district and the Career and Technology Center of Lackawanna County. Special education is provided by the district and the Northeastern Educational Intermediate Unit NEIU19. The federal government controls programs it funds like: Title I funding for low income children in the Elementary and Secondary Education Act  and the No Child Left Behind Act, which mandates the district focus resources on student success in acquiring reading and math skills.

The Lakeland area has become bound by the school as a community. Lakeland's geographic position with respect to the other districts of Lackawanna County is illustrated in the map given. However, no roads provide direct links to Mid Valley or North Pocono. Also, not shown are neighboring districts Mountain View (Susquehanna County) to the north and Western Wayne (Wayne County) to the east. Long Carbondale and Valley View borders indicate Lakeland's particularly strong relationships with each. They are two of the Chiefs' most competitive athletic rivals. Many Lakeland families have close relatives in, or descend from natives of, both areas. Finally, most of Lakeland's country residents travel to the city of Carbondale or the towns of Valley View regularly for work, shopping, and recreation.

Regions and constituent municipalities
The district is divided into three regions, which include the following municipalities:

Region I
Greenfield Township
Jermyn Borough

Region II
Carbondale Township
Mayfield Borough

Region III
Scott Township

Extracurricular activities
The district offers a wide variety of clubs, activities and an extensive, publicly funded sports program.

Athletics
The district provides:

Fall Sports
Cross Country
Golf
Football
Football cheerleading
Jr. High girls' basketball
Soccer

Winter Sports
Basketball
Basketball cheerleading
Bowling
Spring Sports
Baseball
Lacrosse
Softball
Track and Field

Performing Arts
Chorus
Concert Band
Curtain Club
Drill Team
Marching band

Miscellaneous

Art club
Envirothon
Family, Career and Community Leaders of America
Future Business Leaders of America
Lakeland Lance journalism club
Mock Trial
Mu Alpha Theta
National Honor Society
Pennsylvania Junior Academy of Science
Reading team
Scholastic Bowl
Ski club
Students Against Destructive Decisions
Student Council
Watershed club
Yearbook club

References

External links
District Website

School districts established in 1968
School districts in Lackawanna County, Pennsylvania